Megasporia is a genus of poroid crust fungi in the family Polyporaceae. It was circumscribed in 2013 as a segregate genus of Megasporoporia. Most Megasporia species are found in subtropical and tropical China; the type species, Megasporia hexagonoides, is found in tropical and subtropical America.

Species
Megasporia cystidiolophora (B.K.Cui & Y.C.Dai) B.K.Cui & Hai J.Li (2013)
Megasporia ellipsoidea (B.K.Cui & P.Du) B.K.Cui & Hai J.Li (2013)
Megasporia guangdongensis B.K.Cui & Hai J.Li (2013)
Megasporia hengduanensis B.K.Cui & Hai J.Li (2013)
Megasporia hexagonoides (Speg.) B.K.Cui, Y.C.Dai & Hai J.Li (2013)
Megasporia major (G.Y.Zheng & Z.S.Bi) B.K. Cui, Y.C.Dai & Hai J.Li (2013)
Megasporia rimosa Y.Yuan, X.H.Ji & Y.C.Dai (2017)
Megasporia tropica Y.Yuan, X.H.Ji & Y.C.Dai (2017)
Megasporia violacea (B.K.Cui & P.Du) B.K. Cui, Y.C.Dai & Hai J.Li (2013)
Megasporia yunnanensis Y.Yuan, X.H.Ji & Y.C.Dai (2017)

References

Polyporaceae
Polyporales genera
Taxa described in 2013
Taxa named by Yu-Cheng Dai
Taxa named by Bao-Kai Cui